
This is a list of aircraft in alphabetical order beginning with 'S'.

Sm

S-M-J 
(M L Shanklin, (--) Moore, (--) Johnson, Indianapolis and Mooresville, IN)
 S-M-J Maverick I

SMA 
(Société Minié Aéronautiques)
See:Minié

SME Aviation 
 SME Aero Tiga

Smedley 
(Robert R Smedley, Tulsa, Oklahoma, United States)
 Smedley Rapid Robert

Smidley 
(Henry Smidley, College Park, Maryland, United States)
 Smidley 1910 Monoplane

Śmielkiewicz-Gębali-Kurbiel
(George Śmielkiewicz, Wiesław Gębali and Adam Kurbiel)
 Śmielkiewicz-Gębali-Kurbiel Akro Viper

Smith 
(A J Smith)
 Smith AJ-2

Smith
(Alan C. Smith)
 Smith FSRW-1

Smith 
(Arthur L Smith, Ft Wayne IN. 19??: San Francisco, California, United States)
 Smith 1910 Biplane

Smith 
(Cyril B Smith II, Colorado Springs, Colorado, United States)
 Smith Der Kricket

Smith 
(Edward F Smith, 354 W Anderson St, Hackensack, New Jersey, United States)
 Smith S-1
 Smith ES-5

Smith 
(Elmer L. Smith, Eugene, Oregon, United States)
 Smith 1933 Biplane

Smith 
(Everett A Smith, Missoula, Montana, United States)
 Smith S-1

Smith 
(F.P. Smith)
 Smith 1911 Monoplane

Smith 
(Floyd Smith, San Diego, California, United States)
 Smith 1912 Biplane

Smith 
(Frank W Smith, Fullerton, California c.1980: Norco, California, United States)
 Smith DSA-1 Miniplane
 Smith Miniplane +1 two-seat version by Donald Smith
 Sky Classic Miniplane 2000 – updated version by Sky Classic Aircraft

Smith 
(Glen A Smith, Mason City, Iowa and Detroit, Michigan, United States )
 Smith S-2

Smith 
(H.J. Smith, Minneapolis, Minnesota, United States)
 Smith June-Bug Aerial Flivver

Smith 
(J W Smith, Cicero, Illinois, United States)
 Smith 1929 Monoplane

Smith 
(Kyle Smith Aircraft Co, Wheeling, West Virginia, United States)
 Smith 1917 Biplane
 Smith 1918 Biplane
 West Virginia C-3

Smith 
(L.B. Smith Aircraft Corp, Miami, Florida, United States)
 Smith Tempo II

Smith 
(Mike Smith Aero Inc, Johnson City, Kansas, United States)
 Smith Lightning Model 400

Smith 
((Rexford) Rex Smith Aeroplane Co, College Park, Maryland, United States)
 Rex Smith Biplane

Smith 
(Simon Smith, Beloit, Wisconsin, United States)
 Smith 1930 Monoplane
 Smith O (re-engined Acme Sportsman 21)

Smith 
(Smith Airplane Co, Tacoma, Washington, United States)
 Smith S-2

Smith 
(Ted R Smith & Associates, Santa Maria, California, United States)
 Smith Aerostar 320
 Smith Aerostar 600
 Smith Aerostar 600A
 Smith Aerostar 600E
 Smith Aerostar 601
 Smith Aerostar 601B
 Smith Aerostar 601P
 Smith Aerostar 601L
 Smith Aerostar 602P Sequoia
 Smith Aerostar 620
 Smith Superstar 700
 Smith Superstar 700P
 Smith Superstar 702P
 Smith Aerostar 800

Smith 
(Wilbur L Smith, Bloomington, Illinois, United States)
 Smith Termite

Smith 
(Yale Elmer Smith, Eugene, Oregon, United States)
 Smith HS

Smith-Cirigliano 
(Everett M Smith, New Castle, Delaware, United States)
 Smith-Cirigliano Baby Hawk

Smith-McCurdy-Lardin 
(Everett Smith, W A McCurdy, Arthur Lardin, New Castle, Delaware, United States)
 Smith-McCurdy-Lardin AL-1

Smokovitz 
(Anthony Smokowitz, Vulcan, Michigan, United States)
 Smokowitz 1933 Biplane (modified Gere Sport)

Smolin 
(A. Smolin)
 Smolin KSM-1

Smyth 
(Jerry Smyth, Huntington, Illinois, United States)
 Smyth Sidewinder

References

Further reading

External links

 List Of Aircraft (S)

de:Liste von Flugzeugtypen/N–S
fr:Liste des aéronefs (N-S)
nl:Lijst van vliegtuigtypes (N-S)
pt:Anexo:Lista de aviões (N-S)
ru:Список самолётов (N-S)
sv:Lista över flygplan/N-S
vi:Danh sách máy bay (N-S)